Laurence Beauregard is a Canadian freestyle wrestler. She is a four-time medalist, including two gold medals, at the Pan American Wrestling Championships.

Career 

At the 2019 Pan American Wrestling Championships held in Buenos Aires, Argentina she won the gold medal in the women's 59 kg event. A year earlier she won the silver medal in this event.

She won the gold medal in her event at the 2022 Pan American Wrestling Championships held in Acapulco, Mexico. She competed in the 59 kg event at the 2022 World Wrestling Championships held in Belgrade, Serbia.

Achievements

References

External links 
 

Living people
Year of birth missing (living people)
Place of birth missing (living people)
Canadian female sport wrestlers
Pan American Wrestling Championships medalists
21st-century Canadian women